Kenny & Zuke's Delicatessen is a Jewish delicatessen in Portland, Oregon serving primarily non-kosher foods.

History
The restaurant opened in October 2007, however, the principal owners, Ken Gordon and Nick Zukin, began their venture at the Hillsdale Farmers' Market as The Pastrami King in 2006.  After regularly selling pastrami, they moved to Ken Gordon's restaurant, Ken's Place, for a Saturday brunch, renaming the venture Kenny & Zuke's.  Because of its popularity, the two started looking for a permanent location for the deli. Nick Zukin no longer is associated with Kenny & Zukes.

In September 2019 Ken Gordon confirmed that the company's LLC, Body by Pastrami, will be undergoing Chapter 11 reorganization. The decision was prompted by a civil suit from food distributor Performance Food Group, alleging Kenny and Zuke's owes $184,494 in unpaid invoices. According to Gordon, the planned reorganization will allow the debt owed to multiple creditors to be paid back in full over the course of eight to ten years while drastically decreasing their monthly payments, and allowing the business to remain open. He added that the restaurant is in "absolutely no danger of closing, or curtailing operations in any way".

Awards and recognition
Named one of the top 10 sandwich shops in the country by Bon Appetit. Also named among the best restaurants in Portland by the Oregonian, which also named its Pastrami Burger one of the city's "Best Bites", and the Willamette Week, which also named it among the best spots for lunch, sandwiches, pre-show dinners, and lines worth the wait. Its Cobb Salad was named best in the city by Portland Monthly.

Kenny and Zuke's was featured on Portland TV channel 12's "Dirty Dining" segment on November 13, 2008, revealing that the popular restaurant had received a 73 because of repeat violations. Kenny & Zuke's most recent score, September 10, 2009, was a 91, with a previous score, observed March 13, 2009, of 84.

 Featured in the New York Times as the future of delicatessen.
 Named one of the best delis in the world in Maxim Magazine.
 Highlighted in Gourmet Magazine as one of two delis in North America leading an artisan revival in Jewish foods.

See also
 List of Ashkenazi Jewish restaurants
 List of delicatessens

References

External links
 Kenny & Zuke's Delicatessen (official website)
 Multnomah County Health Department restaurant inspections
 The Oregonian Review
 The Willamette Week Review
 Seattle Magazine Review

 

2007 establishments in Oregon
Ashkenazi Jewish culture in the United States
Ashkenazi Jewish restaurants
Companies that filed for Chapter 11 bankruptcy in 2019
Jewish delicatessens in the United States
Jews and Judaism in Portland, Oregon
Privately held companies based in Oregon
Restaurants established in 2007
Restaurants in Portland, Oregon
Southwest Portland, Oregon
Delicatessens in Oregon